Sporting Clube de Portugal is a Portuguese professional cycling team that existed from 1911 to 2010 and was refounded in 2020. It is part of the Sporting Clube de Portugal sports club based in Lisbon. It participated in the 1978 and 1984 editions of the Tour de France, with Paulo Ferreira's victory in the fifth stage in 1984 the team's sole win of the race.

Between 2016 and 2019, Sporting had a protocol with CC Tavira and the team was called "Sporting-Tavira".

References

Cycling teams based in Portugal
1911 establishments in Portugal
Sporting CP sports